Topal Teymur – is a play, historic drama in five acts written by Huseyn Javid, Azerbaijani poet and playwright, in 1925. Topal Teymur is a 1926 play is about Timur, the Central Asian conqueror. It premiered in 1926 in Baku.

It was considered that the poet idealized feudal conquerors and that “Timur was idealized with his ideas of consolidation of Turkic, Tatar and Mongolian peoples under the flag of integrated Turan Empire.” Some people said that there is a detachment toward modernity in the play and some found out nationalistic motifs.

References 

Azerbaijani plays
1925 plays
Plays set in Asia
Plays set in the 14th century
Plays set in the 15th century
Cultural depictions of Timur
Plays based on real people
Azerbaijani-language plays